= Y gun =

A Y gun may refer to:

- A type of Depth charge projector
- A gun in the Y position of a war ship; in this context the term will normally be plural i.e. Y guns
